The August 2020 Midwest derecho was a powerful derecho affecting the Midwestern United States on August 10–11, 2020, primarily eastern Nebraska, Iowa, Illinois, Wisconsin, and Indiana. It caused high winds and spawned an outbreak of weak tornadoes. Some areas reported torrential rain and large hail.

The greatest damage occurred in eastern Iowa, and northern Illinois, where multiple tornadoes touched down.

Millions across the Midwest were affected by wide-scale utility disruptions, residential and commercial property damage, and severe damage to corn and soybean crops. Cedar Rapids, Iowa, was the most severely damaged, suffering a near-complete blackout that lasted for weeks in some areas, widespread and severe property damage, and an estimated loss of at least half of the city's tree canopy. The derecho caused over $11 billion (2020 USD) in damages and spawned a years-long cleanup effort.

Meteorological history 

Derechos of similar intensity to the August 2020 storm impact the Midwestern U.S. roughly once per decade, with similar derechos having occurred in 1998 and 2011. As with derechos in general, the continuous downwelling of high winds associated with the nearby jet stream and the expansion of dense rain-cooled air in the storm's wake induced the destructive winds and the storm's motion. However, the August 2020 derecho was unusual for the longevity of the damaging winds it produced; some areas were subjected to these winds for up to an hour compared to the 10–20 minutes of sustained damaging winds in a typical derecho, resulting in conditions similar to the passage of a hurricane's eyewall. Media outlets described the storm as an "inland hurricane". A combination of strong ambient winds and extreme convective instability facilitated the strength and unusual characteristics of the derecho. The latter factor resulted from the conducive overlapping of moist air drawn northward across the Mississippi Valley and warm and dry air aloft originating from the Southwestern U.S., resulting in an elevated mixed layer that allowed instability to escalate. These convectively unstable conditions permeated across Iowa and were characterized by steep lapse rates in the mid-levels of the troposphere as sampled via weather balloon launches from Omaha, Nebraska, on the morning of August 10, and from Davenport, Iowa, at noon that day; the atmospheric sounding retrieved from the Davenport balloon launch observed lapse rates of 8.5°C/km. The warm front demarcating the northward push of the unstable air also focused the development of storms across the region.

Prior to August 10, the Storm Prediction Center (SPC) and the local offices of the National Weather Service (NWS) did not anticipate a storm of exceptional magnitude. Predictive weather models also yielded inaccurate projections of the storm and continued to do so even on the day of the event. On August 3, the SPC noted in a Convective Outlook that a series of shortwave troughs was forecast to move through northern portions of the U.S. in the coming days, becoming possible impetuses for thunderstorm development leading up to and on August 10. Three days before the event, the SPC assessed a Marginal Risk of severe weather for a swath of the central U.S. extending from northern Kansas to southern Michigan, including parts of southern Iowa, northern Missouri, and northern Illinois. The risk level was escalated to a Slight Risk  at midnight on August 10 prior to the onset of the damaging storms. Winds blowing from the west were juxtaposed atop near-surface winds blowing from the southwest and south, resulting in strong wind shear over the region. The derecho began as a cluster of scattered thunderstorms that had formed during the previous night over south-central South Dakota. In response to these developments, the SPC issued a special Convective Outlook at 8:00 a.m., highlighting a now Enhanced Risk  of severe weather for areas in the storms' path including Cedar Rapids, Iowa, the Quad Cities metropolitan area, and Peoria, Illinois. According to the SPC, there was a 30 percent likelihood of areas within the Enhanced Risk zone experiencing thunderstorm winds or wind gusts in excess of 50 kt (60 mph; 95 km/h).

After 8:00 a.m., the storm moved through Sioux City, Iowa, crossing the Big Sioux River and entering western Iowa. Heating associated with the daytime hours made for warmer conditions near the ground, allowing strong winds produced by the storms to descend to and reach the surface. The storm's winds began to increase considerably after the storm reached west central Iowa at around 10: a.m. Over the next two hours, the storm traversed central Iowa with a rapid forward speed of up to 60 mph (95 km/h), impacting communities including Ames, Des Moines, and Marshalltown. Wind gusts approaching  were produced by the storm during this period. Aloft, the storm was being supported by a rear-inflow jet sporting winds of 80–100 kt (90–115 mph; 150–185 km/h) with the downwind airmass exhibiting convective available potential energy (CAPE) values between 2000–2500 J/kg. 

At 11:25 a.m., a severe thunderstorm watch tagged as denoting a particularly dangerous situation was issued by the SPC for areas ahead of the storm including central Iowa, southern Wisconsin, northern Illinois, and northwestern Indiana. Shortly after, the SPC introduced a Moderate Risk for severe weather in its categorical outlooks for similar areas. Around the same time, a counterclockwise vortex developed on the northern end of the storm, resulting in the storm attaining a bow-like structure with its strongest winds at the apex of this shape. University of Oklahoma meteorologist and tornado expert Stephen Corfidi remarked that the vortex was "one of the most distinctive ones of that size" he had ever saw. The core of stronger winds tracked east at speeds of 65–70 mph (110–130 km/h) and bore faster wind speeds. The derecho was at its strongest when it moved across the Cedar Rapids area of eastern Iowa. Based on the severity of damage observed, the NWS estimated that wind gusts of  impacted parts of Benton and Linn counties in Iowa, including downtown Cedar Rapids and Marion. These winds diminished slightly as the derecho approached the Mississippi River, though gusts of  remained widespread. The more extreme corridor of wind gusts transitioned into a broader swath of  winds as the storm moved across northern Illinois and northwestern Indiana between 2–5 p.m. Despite the weakening of straight-line winds, the atmospheric environment became more conducive for tornadogenesis during this time. This resulted in several brief EF0 and EF1 tornadoes developing over northern Illinois and Indiana. The derecho's winds continued to lessen as the storm tracked farther east, weakening below damaging levels shortly after 7 p.m. as the storm was moving into Ohio and Michigan.

Impact and damage

Overview 
In its October 2020 review, NOAA updated its database of billion-dollar disasters to include this event (along with other disasters from the summer season) with preliminary estimated damages averaging 7.5 billion dollars, before upgrading the estimate to $11 billion.  it is the most costly thunderstorm in US history. The financial toll of this storm was the second-highest for an individual 2020 U.S. natural disaster, surpassed only by Hurricane Laura's preliminary damage figure of $14.1 billion.

Utilities and telecommunications disruption 

Utility disruption and infrastructure damage occurred in much of the storm's path. Early estimates showed more than a million customers without power. Between August 10 and 13, 1.9 million customers were affected by 1.4 million maximum simultaneous outages—759,000 in Illinois, 585,000 in Iowa, 283,000 in Indiana, and 345,000 in other states, including Missouri, Wisconsin, and Michigan.

Three days after the derecho, over 100,000 customers in Illinois, and 200,000 in Iowa, remained without power. The damage in some affected areas was so extensive that Mid-American Energy sent linemen to neighboring utility Alliant Energy to assist. The Duane Arnold Energy Center cooling towers were damaged and the nuclear reactor was shut down permanently. By August 23, Alliant announced that power had been restored to 99 percent of their affected customers. Mediacom, a telecommunications company, reported 340,000 customers lost Internet access in the affected states.

Property damage 

The storm's winds caused wide-scale damage to plants, particularly trees, snapping large limbs, ripping off branches, and even felling or uprooting whole trees, often damaging houses and vehicles, as well as electrical and telecommunications infrastructure. Houses sustained significant damage to roofs, windows, and siding. Commercial and industrial property also sustained major structural damage from the storm. Large vehicles (such as semi-trailer trucks and recreational vehicles) as well as mobile homes were blown over, sent flying, or destroyed. Terry Dusky, chief executive officer of electrical infrastructure company ITC Midwest, described the storm damage as "...equivalent of a 40-mile wide tornado that rolled over 100 miles of the state."

Agricultural damage 

Farmers in Iowa, a major agricultural state and top corn producer in the US, found their crops had been flattened and agricultural infrastructure such as silos, grain bins and grain elevators imploded by the storm. The crop damage was visible in satellite imagery, which the USDA called impressive. NASA researchers assisted in satellite image analysis of derecho crop damage.

On August 19, he said the storm destroyed an estimated  worth of grain storage and processing infrastructure as well.

Prescient Weather CEO Jan Dutton estimated that  had been destroyed or degraded, a small portion of the tens of billions of bushels the US produces annually. Arlan Suderman, chief commodities economist for StoneX, estimated the damage to Iowa crops to be .

The agricultural damage of the derecho was compounded by a concurrent drought affecting 31 counties. Farmers preferred drought to wet conditions in the wake of the derecho damage, as wet conditions would induce rot and make it harder to harvest the flattened crops.

Nebraska 
In eastern Nebraska near Tekamah and Fremont, some of earliest storm damage occurred. The National Weather Service issued a warning at 8:45 a.m., with Omaha reporting its first damage just eight minutes later. Winds reached , tree damage was significant, downed limbs blocked some roads. At least one person was injured. In Omaha, the state's largest city, over 50,000 were left without power, a couple thousand remained so for two or three days.

Iowa 

The Iowa Governor's office estimated on August 16 that the storm severely damaged or destroyed over 8,000 homes and caused $23.6 million in damage to public infrastructure. The cost of cleaning up debris from the storm was estimated at $21.6 million. Several major roads in Iowa City were closed due to storm debris, including Interstate 380 between Iowa City and Cedar Rapids. Four state parks were closed through the end of August for cleanup;  all had reopened except Palisades-Kepler State Park, which was closed indefinitely due to storm damage until reopening on April 23, 2021. Emma Hanigan, an urban forester for the Iowa Department of Natural Resources, said that the impact on the state's trees will be felt for decades.

Affected towns and cities advised residents not to travel due to damage. City-wide and county-wide states of emergency were declared. On August 13, Iowa Governor Kim Reynolds issued a state-level disaster proclamation for 23 of Iowa's counties, which expanded to 27 counties on August 14. On August 17, President Trump partially approved Gov. Reynolds' request for a federal disaster declaration. An amended declaration for Individual Assistance was approved by the White House for Linn County, Iowa alone on August 20, then expanded to 10 counties on September 1 along with concurrent natural disaster declarations from the United States Department of Agriculture on September 3. On September 10, Gov. Reynolds extended the disaster proclamation for those aforementioned Iowa counties. On September 11, it was announced FEMA added seven additional Iowa counties (for a total of 23) to the August 17 federal disaster declaration, as well as the Sac and Fox Tribe of the Mississippi in Iowa.

Cedar Rapids area 

Cedar Rapids, Iowa, the Linn County seat and second-largest city in the state, was one of the hardest hit areas of the storm. Adjutant General Benjamin Corell, Commander of the Iowa National Guard, compared the extent of the damage with what he personally witnessed after Hurricane Katrina. Cedar Rapids city officials described the damage as being worse than the 2008 flood. Local hospitals, running on backup power, saw hundreds of injuries due to the storm. The widespread debris, downed electrical lines, and gas leaks led to a curfew through August 24. Cedar Rapids Director of Public Works Jen Winter said in September 2020 that months of cleanup lay ahead for the city.

Utility damage and outages 
After the storm, Linn County peaked at over 95 percent power loss to residents due to infrastructure damage, with Cedar Rapids experiencing a maximum 98 percent power loss. Thousands of electrical poles and miles of wire were downed; many residential gas connections were also broken. Radio masts and towers were damaged or destroyed (pictured right), causing radio outages and dysfunctional mobile phone service.

On August 12, Mediacom said 57,000 modems were offline across eastern Iowa, most of them in the Cedar Rapids area; two days later, nearly 10,000 of those customers were still without service. On August 14, a hundred engineering and support personnel of the Iowa National Guard were activated to assist the region. A week after the storm, 75,000 Iowans, most of them in Linn County, still lacked electricity. On August 19, the Linn County Rural Electric Cooperative announced 99 percent power restoration to its customers. By September 22, hundreds of Mediacom and ImOn customers still remained without internet service.

Property damage 

Almost every structure within the  Cedar Rapids city limits, including residences, 20 schools, and businesses, were damaged in some way, much of it severe, some of it catastrophic.

Hundreds of thousands of trees, for which Cedar Rapids was known, were severely damaged or felled by the storm with both Cedar Rapids and nearby Marion estimated to have lost half or more of their tree canopy from the storm; professional arborists and state foresters urged residents to seek professional help for their tree damage, saying it could take months to clean up. Many local businesses were forced to close, some indefinitely due to damage. Most of the city's roads became impassible due to storm debris. Without electrical refrigeration, food spoiled en masse while trash and recycling pickup had been halted until August 31 due to impassable streets causing bags of rotting trash to line curbsides, subjecting them to scavengers.

Evaluation and cleanup of damage and debris 

In a preliminary evaluation four days after the storm, the Cedar Rapids fire department declared over a thousand residences unsafe to occupy; in addition, 300 had non-structural damage and over 200 cosmetic damage. By August 23, that count had shrunk to 140, with many more buildings being added to the non-structural damage category.

Alliant Energy was still working on restoring street lights in the area, many still hampered by debris or broken trees.

On November 9, 2020 Dr. Melanie Giesler, a local physician, said increased allergies in the area were likely due to the derecho damage, spurred on by dust, debris, and mold growing on dead plant matter.

In July 2022, The Gazette reported that nearly two years after the derecho, owners of homes with historic preservation concerns were still repairing antique windows damaged by the storm. Local groups and trusts were reported to have organized workshops for affected homeowners about how to properly restore this type of construction.

Debris collection and tree removals 
On August 21, Marion city officials announced 98 percent of its streets were cleared and over 7,000 truckloads of debris had been removed. A month after the storm, Cedar Rapids had completed the first pass of storm debris collection on only 37.5 percent of its streets.

As of November 24, 2020, cleanup was ongoing with the city currently working on the final public collection of non-organic debris. Collection of organic/tree debris is continuing indefinitely with the city having removed  of organic debris to date; the trimming of damaged tree limbs in the public right of way is 73 percent complete.

On December 3, Taylor Burgin, Cedar Rapids' construction engineering manager, said that city crews and contractors are beginning a thorough cleanup of city parks — this is expected to add an estimated  to city removal metrics. Burgin also noted the city has removed around 2,000 trees, but needed at least 10,000 more to complete citywide cleanup.

Des Moines metropolitan area 

In the Des Moines metropolitan area, over 132,000 customer experienced outages, according to MidAmerican. The city said on August 21 that cleanup was slower than desired, estimating that damage cleanup could take up to six weeks. It planned to lease equipment from contractors to accelerate cleanup.

The city of Ankeny estimated it would take four to six weeks to fully clean up debris. A Hy-Vee grocery store there was found by the Iowa Department of Natural Resources to have illegally dumped  of spoiled milk into storm sewers, contaminating a local waterway. The company assisted the state in cleanup efforts, blaming misinformed employees. Buccaneer Arena, home ice of the Des Moines Buccaneers minor-league hockey team, sustained significant roof damage.

Marshalltown 
Marshalltown suffered extensive property damage. Over a hundred cars parked near a factory had their windows blown out. Reports described  winds, roofs being ripped off, and loose wood debris embedded in the sides of buildings. One week after the storm, nearly 7,000 residents of the city were still waiting for power restoration; 99 percent restoration was achieved on Aug 23. The damage to public parks in the city and surrounding Marshall County was "extensive", particularly to trees.

Damage metrics released on September 1 showed nearly 2,800 buildings were damaged or destroyed in the storm, more than the 2018 EF3 tornado which hit the city. City cleanup for the derecho is estimated around $4 million, of which FEMA and the Iowa Homeland Security and Emergency Management will assist for reimbursement. By August 20, the city had hauled away  of debris, almost triple the amount of the 2018 tornado. By late October, Justin Nickel, the city's public works director, said debris collection and cleanup were nearly complete for the city.

Marshalltown Veteran's Memorial Coliseum, a historic city sports venue, is reopening soon  after being severely damaged by the 2018 tornado and later impacted by the derecho.  Riverside Cemetery, a century-old burial site located in the city, remains littered with debris as the city struggles to raise money for its care.

Illinois 

Across the state of Illinois, high winds and fifteen weak tornadoes, the majority of the derecho's tornadoes , caused variable damage to buildings, trees, and vehicles. Officials reported a dozen individuals directly injured by the storm across the state. A month after the storm, Chicago was still cleaning up storm damaged areas. In city parks, over 500 trees fell. The city fielded over 12,000 emergency calls regarding trees in the city after the storm hit. Over 800,000 Com Ed customers lost power.

Confirmed fatalities 
In Fort Wayne, Indiana, a woman was killed when high winds tipped over her mobile home. In Poweshiek County, Iowa, Emergency Management confirmed the deaths of two: a Malcom woman in her 40s killed when a tree fell on her porch and a Brooklyn man in his 40s, a city employee and electrician, killed by electrocution from a downed power line he was attempting to repair. The Linn County Sheriff's Office confirmed a 63-year-old man died from a falling tree while biking.

Responses and criticism 
In the week after the storm, Iowa elected officials such as US Senators Chuck Grassley and Joni Ernst, US Representative Abby Finkenauer, and Governor Kim Reynolds called for and worked to secure a federal disaster declaration from President Donald Trump. The declaration was formally requested by Reynolds on August 16 for nearly $4 billion in federal aid.

The following day, Trump announced he had partially approved Reynolds's request, but did not approve the requested FEMA Individual Assistance Program, which Reynolds's office says "provides disaster-impacted homeowners and businesses with programs and services to maximize recovery, including assistance with housing, personal property replacement, medical expenses and legal services". An amended declaration to include Individual Assistance worked its way through Washington, according to Reynolds. The White House approved it for Linn County on August 20.

On September 1, the governor's Office announced the addition of 10 counties approved for FEMA Individual Assistance. On September 3, US Secretary of Agriculture Sonny Perdue declared natural disasters in eighteen, opening up Farm Service Agency and other USDA disaster relief programs. On September 11, it was announced FEMA added seven Iowa counties to the August 17 federal disaster declaration increasing the total counties to 23, allowing for Public Assistance Program use in those counties; a separate declaration was declared for the Sac and Fox Tribe of the Mississippi in Iowa as well.

Official visits 

On August 13, Vice President Mike Pence held two campaign rallies in Iowa. He promised to help Iowa rebuild, but did not tour areas damaged by the storm.

On August 14, Reynolds arrived in Cedar Rapids, Iowa with more than 100 Iowa National Guard members, activated to help repair the damage.

On August 15, Finkenauer toured damage in Marshalltown.

On August 17, Pete Gaynor, Administrator of FEMA, traveled to Iowa to meet with Governor Reynolds about the disaster.

On August 18, Trump arrived at midday in Cedar Rapids, joining a private meeting with Iowa senators Grassley, Ernst and Cedar Rapids Mayor Brad Hart. At the meeting, Hart begged Trump to approve the Individual Assistance Program. Trump remained at the airport and did not interact with the public, tour damage, or assist in recovery efforts during his visit.

On August 19, Naig met with farmers in Marion to personally assess the damage. Ernst toured damaged in Marshalltown.

On September 2, Grassley and Ernst fielded questions from Cedar Rapids-area non-profit organizations.

On September 3, US Secretary of Agriculture Sonny Perdue underwent an Iowa National Guard-hosted aerial tour of crop damage in Iowa along with Reynolds, Ernst, and Naig.

Local, non-government, or individual assistance efforts 
On August 14, the city of Cedar Rapids set up five resource centers to distribute basic necessities to the public. These centers were later shut down on August 31. Many local businesses, private individuals, religious groups, and non-profit organizations, such as Cedar Valley Black Lives Matter, The Salvation Army and Tyson Foods, and United Way, raised money online or provided relief efforts on their own, distributing food, fuel, toiletries, or assisting in debris removal.

Mid-American Energy, one of Iowa's two major electric utilities, gave away bagged ice in Cedar Rapids on August 20–21. Operation BBQ Relief, a disaster relief agency specializing in barbecue, deployed to Cedar Rapids starting August 16, providing over 45,000 meals to residents as of August 21, earning praise from politicians. Local non-profits told Iowa's senators that assisting the region has been difficult due to the COVID-19 pandemic significantly reducing their donations and funding. On November 14, a large replanting campaign was announced that would begin in the spring of 2021.

Criticism

Lack of news coverage 
Local news media were hard-pressed to provide reporting under disaster conditions, limiting national news coverage of the storm. KCRG-TV anchor Beth Malicki was especially prominent in speaking out on awareness of the situation. On August 13, Cedar Rapids Mayor Hart gave an interview where he rejected requesting National Guard assistance, uncertain of what it could do.

Lack of response and assistance 
On August 14, Ashton Kutcher, originally from Cedar Rapids, criticized the lack of federal response and aid. He called on Pence and Trump to aid the affected areas. The same day, Iowa state officials were questioned about why it took three days to begin aid effort. General Benjamin Corell, commander of the Iowa National Guard, said they first received local requests for help on August 13.

Residents of Cedar Rapids had mixed emotions regarding official responses and assistance. For many, they felt ignored for days after the storm and offered too-little, too-late by the non-local support. Some impoverished or less-affluent neighborhood residents said they felt neglected, abandoned, or given lower priority among utility and government assistance. Many grassroots efforts began hours after the storm subsided, with residents lending support through mutual aid, and trying to take care of the least fortunate, but finding working with government and assistance organizations very disheartening.

The lack of electricity, telecommunications, and ability to travel led to the delays in assistance according to both official and non-government organizations. These explanations did not reassure storm-battered populations. Tamara Marcus, activist with Cedar Rapids Advocates for Social Justice, a Black Lives Matter organization, said "We need to ask ourselves, 'Why is it that each time we have a disaster or pandemic, the most-vulnerable are the worst impacted, particularly communities of color?' " during a September 2 forum with Ernst and Grassley. Residential damage doubled the homeless population in the Cedar Rapids area as some landlords evicted residents from unsafe apartment complexes.

Role of politicians 
Abby Finkenauer, then-US Representative for Iowa's 1st congressional district (which encompasses Cedar Rapids and other hard-hit areas), used her local office for an assistance event, personally handing out essentials such as food, water, and toiletries until supplies ran out. Finkenauer's challenger in the 2020 United States House of Representatives elections, then-Iowa State Representative Ashley Hinson criticized her opponent for showing images of these events in a campaign ad, with the Republican Party of Iowa calling it "disgraceful". The Democratic Congressional Campaign Committee returned the criticism, saying that while Hinson had released a stereotypical ad and posed for storm-related photo ops, Finkenauer actually worked on doing something meaningful at the time. Hinson has since collaborated with local religious and charitable groups.

Ernst and her Democratic challenger in that year's election, Theresa Greenfield, both provided assistance. Greenfield handed out supplies, served food, and toured damage. Ernst helped distribute food with local charities including Meals on Wheels. Neither politician saw the disaster assistance as optional. Reynolds and Hinson both visited the August 21 Operation BBQ event.

Political science professors in the state commented. Tim Hagle from the University of Iowa said the key is "to strike the balance between political grandstanding — or opportunism — and a genuine desire to help, which also helps you politically". Chris Larimer of the University of Northern Iowa concurred, adding that practical help is more likely to earn voter support. At Cornell College, Megan Goldberg said "an elected official wants to claim credit for disaster relief that is effective, while avoiding blame for any mismanagement of disaster relief", concluding that "even a candidate or official who genuinely wants to visit a site — either to help or to gather information — has to think about how the visit can be spun to his or her political advantage, and how to reply to criticisms of such visits. But that's the way it often is these days."

Possible impact of climate change 

The severity of the storm raised the question of whether climate change intensified it. A variety of climate experts from Georgia Tech, Colorado University, North Carolina State, and other institutions told the Associated Press, in the wake of the derecho, 2020 wildfire season, and 2020 Atlantic hurricane season, that more intense natural disasters like these are consistent with climate change.

Climate change is a possible cause of the intensity of derechos overall, said Iowa State University and National Weather Service (Des Moines) scientists;  experts disagreed if it was responsible for this particular storm. The NWS said it was atypical for such a severe storm to not appear in the previous day's weather models. Additionally, NWS research into derechos indicates weather patterns in the region to be shifting towards the poles, which might be a result of climate change. The high damage estimate aligns with analysis showing increases in the costs of natural disasters due as a result of climate change-driven storm intensity.

Official notices and records 

The Storm Prediction Center (SPC) did not initially foresee an event of this magnitude, primarily due to sporadic model solutions, more specifically the large variance in intensity, location, and coverage of this derecho. During the 06:00 UTC convective outlook update, a slight risk for severe thunderstorms was introduced in an area spanning approximately from Kansas to central Illinois due to other severe weather potential, with lower threats in the area eventually hit by the derecho. As model guidance became clearer during the overnight hours, parts of Iowa and Illinois were put under an enhanced risk at 13:00 UTC before the region was further upgraded to a moderate risk at 16:30 UTC once the derecho was clearly underway and expected to continue.

Official NWS Storm Prediction Center publications

Severe Weather Watch Bulletins

Mesoscale Discussions

Highest recorded winds

Confirmed tornadoes

See also

 List of natural disasters in the United States
 List of derecho events
 1998 Corn Belt derecho
 May 2009 Southern Midwest derecho
 July 2011 Midwest Derecho
 June 2012 North American derecho
 Tornadoes of 2020

Notes

References

External links 
National Weather Service regional office summaries:
August 10, 2020 Derecho (NWSFO Des Moines, Iowa)
Midwest Derecho - August 10, 2020 (NWSFO Quad Cities, Iowa/Illinois)
August 10, 2020: Derecho Brings Widespread Severe Wind Damage Along with Several Tornadoes (NWSFO Chicago, Illinois)
Event Summary for August 10, 2020 Derecho (NWSFO Northern Indiana)

Derechos in the United States
History of Cedar Rapids, Iowa
Tornadoes in Iowa
Tornadoes in Wisconsin
Tornadoes in Illinois
Tornadoes in Indiana
F0 and F1 tornadoes
2020 in Iowa
2020 in Illinois
2020 in Indiana
2020 in Michigan
2020 in Wisconsin
2020 meteorology
2020 natural disasters in the United States
August 2020 events in the United States
Tornado outbreaks